Major General Robert Keith Arbuthnott, 15th Viscount of Arbuthnott,  (21 August 1897 – 15 December 1966) was a senior British Army officer who served in both the First World War and the Second World War.

Military career
He was educated at Fettes College and the Royal Military College, Sandhurst. He was commissioned as a second lieutenant into the Black Watch on 14 July 1915 and was mentioned in dispatches and wounded in action during the First World War.

After being promoted to captain on 2 January 1924, he attended the Staff College, Camberley from 1931 to 1932, where Brian Horrocks, Sidney Kirkman, Cameron Nicholson and  Nevil Brownjohn were among his fellow classmates. After service in Palestine, he became an instructor at the Staff College in 1938 and then became a staff officer at Scottish Command in August 1941 during the Second World War. He then became commander of the 198th Brigade in May 1943, commander of the 11th Infantry Brigade in the Italian campaign in September 1943 and then General Officer Commanding 78th Infantry Division in the Italian campaign in November 1944.

After the war, he became Chief of the British Military Mission to the Egyptian Army in 1946, Chief of staff of Scottish Command in 1948 and General Officer Commanding 51st (Highland) Infantry Division  and the Highland District of the Territorial Army in 1949 before retiring from the British Army in 1952 as a major general.

In retirement he was honorary colonel of the Black Watch (Royal Highland Regiment). He served as Deputy Lieutenant (DL), Kincardineshire in 1959 and then as Lord Lieutenant of Kincardineshire from 1960 to 1966.

Decorations
Companion of the Order of the Bath awarded 5 July 1945 for gallant and distinguished services in Italy.
Commander of the Order of the British Empire awarded 21 December 1944 for gallant and distinguished services in Italy
Distinguished Service Order awarded 14 October 1938 for services in Palestine
Military Cross awarded 22 April 1918 for conspicuous gallantry and devotion to duty when in command of a raiding party. He took an active part in the preliminary reconnaissances and training and led his men with great success in the raid, inspiring them by his courage and keenness.
Mentioned in Despatches 24 May 1918
Mentioned in Despatches 25 April 1939 Palestine
Mentioned in Despatches 24 August 1944 for gallant and distinguished services in Italy
Commander of the Legion of Merit (USA) awarded 2 August 1945 for distinguished services in the cause of the Allies.

Family
Lord Arbuthnott married, 10 January 1924, Ursula Collingwood (died 20 December 1989), daughter of Sir William Collingwood, KBE of Dedham Grove, Colchester, Essex. They had three sons (including John Campbell Arbuthnott, 16th Viscount of Arbuthnott, KT who succeeded him) and one daughter.

References

Footnotes

Bibliography

External links

British Army Officers 1939–1945
Generals of World War II

|-
 

|-

1897 births
1966 deaths
Keith Arbuthnott, 15th Viscount of Arbuthnott
Black Watch officers
British Army generals of World War II
British Army personnel of World War I
British military personnel of the 1936–1939 Arab revolt in Palestine
Commanders of the Legion of Merit
Commanders of the Order of the British Empire
Companions of the Distinguished Service Order
Companions of the Order of the Bath
Deputy Lieutenants of Kincardineshire
Graduates of the Royal Military College, Sandhurst
Graduates of the Staff College, Camberley
Lord-Lieutenants of Kincardineshire
People educated at Fettes College
Recipients of the Military Cross
15
Military personnel of British India
British Army major generals
Academics of the Royal Military College, Sandhurst
Academics of the Staff College, Camberley